Platinum tetrafluoride is the inorganic compound with the chemical formula .  In the solid state, the compound features platinum(IV) in octahedral coordination geometry.

Preparation
The compound was first reported by Henri Moissan by the fluorination of platinum metal in the presence of hydrogen fluoride.  A modern synthesis involves thermal decomposition of platinum hexafluoride.

Properties
Platinum tetrafluoride vapour at 298.15 K consists of individual molecules.  The enthalpy of sublimation is 210 kJmol−1. Original analysis of powdered PtF4 suggested a tetrahedral molecular geometry, but later analysis by several methods identified it as octahedral, with four of the six fluorines on each platinum bridging to adjacent platinum centres.

Reactions
A solution of platinum tetrafluoride in water is coloured reddish brown, but it rapidly decomposes, releasing heat and forming an orange coloured platinum dioxide hydrate precipitate and fluoroplatinic acid.
When heated to a red hot temperature, platinum tetrafluoride decomposes to platinum metal and fluorine gas. When heated in contact with glass, silicon tetrafluoride gas is produced along with the metal.

Platinum tetrafluoride can form adducts with selenium tetrafluoride and bromine trifluoride. Volatile crystalline adducts are also formed in combination with BF3, PF3, BCl3, and PCl3.

Related compounds
The fluoroplatinates are salts containing the PtF62− ion. Fluoroplatinic acid H2PtF6 forms yellow crystals that absorb water from the air.  Ammonium, sodium,  magnesium, calcium, strontium, and rare earth including lanthanum fluoropalatinate salts are soluble in water. Potassium, rubidium, caesium, and barium salts are insoluble in water.

References

Fluorides,4
Fluorides
Platinum group halides